Projects and Development India Limited (PDIL) is an Indian central public sector undertaking under the ownership of the Ministry of Chemicals and Fertilizers, Government of India.
PDIL started as the technology wing of Fertilizer Corporation of India in 1951, emerged as a separate entity named FPDIL in 1978 after the restructuring of Fertilizer Corporation of India and was renamed PDIL in 1981 with a head office in Sindri, Jharkhand.

Expertise
PDIL has been playing a pivotal role in the growth of Indian fertilizer industry and has over six decades of experience and expertise in providing design, engineering, and related project execution services from concept to commissioning of various Projects. PDIL contributed in building almost 95% of the fertilizer/ammonia urea units to come up in India. Over two-thirds of the installed capacity of nitrogenous fertilizers in India is produced in plants, engineered, and constructed by PDIL. In addition, PDIL has experience in allied chemical industries with associated off-site and utility facilities, oil and gas sector, viz. product pipelines, LPG terminals, oil terminals, LPG bottling plants, LPG mounded storage, methanol plants, hydrogen plants, and various acid plants.

Activities
PDIL offers design, engineering and associated project management activities from concept to commissioning in the following fields:

Fertilizer - Urea
Chemicals and allied chemicals
Petrochemicals - hydrogen, methanol and various acid plants
Oil and gas - product pipelines, LPG terminals, oil terminals, LPG bottling plants, LPG mounded storage, etc.

Services offered
Pre-project activities: market research, techno-economic feasibility reports, detailed project report, site selection, geo technical investigation/studies

Pre-engineering activities, assistance in statutory clearances, environmental impact assessment, risk analysis

Design and engineering: process design, engineering - mechanical engineering (piping, pressure vessel and heat exchange, machinery/rotating equipment,  materials handling), electrical, instrumentation, civil and structural, procurement, construction management, commissioning, scheduling and monitoring, process evaluation, pipeline survey

Project management consultancy: technology evaluation, selection of process licensor, check and review of vendor drawings, inspection / expediting, scheduling, monitoring and cost control, supervision of construction and erection, pre-commissioning and commissioning, witness and evaluate guarantee tests

Statutory clearances / approvals, selection of engineering/ turnkey contractor, review of basic design package, review / approval of detailed engineering document, ensuring conformity of equipment supplied to approved specifications

References

External links
 

Chemical companies of India
Oil and gas companies of India
Government-owned companies of India
Companies based in Noida
Non-renewable resource companies established in 1978
1978 establishments in Uttar Pradesh
Indian companies established in 1978